Dalijan is a city in Markazi Province, Iran.

Dalijan or Deliijan, also rendered as Dalenjan, may refer to:
 Delijan, Lahijan, Gilan Province
 Delijan, Masal, Gilan Province
 Delijan, Rudsar, Gilan Province
 Dalijan-e Kordha, North Khorasan Province, Iran
 Dalijan-e Torkiyeh, North Khorasan Province, Iran
 Dalijan, Semnan

See also 
 Dilijan, is a spa town and urban municipal community in the Tavush Province of Armenia.